İdilli is a village in the İslahiye District, Gaziantep Province, Turkey. The village had a population of 347 in 2022.

References

Villages in İslahiye District